Arthroleptis mossoensis, the Mosso screeching frog, is a species of frog in the family Arthroleptidae.

References

mossoensis
Frogs of Africa
Amphibians of Burundi
Endemic fauna of Burundi
Amphibians described in 1954
Taxa named by Raymond Laurent
Taxonomy articles created by Polbot